Arabic Presentation Forms-A is a Unicode block encoding contextual forms and ligatures of letter variants needed for Persian, Urdu, Sindhi and Central Asian languages. This block also allocates 32 noncharacters in Unicode, designed specifically for internal use.

The presentation forms are present only for compatibility with older standards such as codepage 864 used in DOS, and are typically used in visual and not logical order. It has been agreed no further presentation forms will be encoded; a contiguous range of 32 noncharacters have been allocated here, and further encodings serve only as fillers.

Block

History
The following Unicode-related documents record the purpose and process of defining specific characters in the Arabic Presentation Forms-A block:

References 

Unicode blocks